Franz Buxbaum (25 February 1900, Liebenau, Graz – 7 February 1979) was an Austrian botanist, specialising in cacti. Neobuxbaumia is named after him.

References 

Scientists from Graz
1900 births
1979 deaths
20th-century Austrian botanists